WTSP (channel 10) is a television station licensed to St. Petersburg, Florida, United States, serving the Tampa Bay area as an affiliate of CBS. The station is owned by Tegna Inc., and maintains studios on Gandy Boulevard on St. Petersburg's northeast side, just off the Gandy Bridge; its transmitter is located in Riverview, Florida.

History
The station first signed on the air on July 18, 1965, as WLCY-TV, becoming the fourth commercial television outlet in the Tampa Bay region in a 12-year timeframe, and the fifth overall. The station debuted a week and a half after the conclusion of a decade-long court battle between five prospective owners seeking the Channel 10 license, including the St. Petersburg Times. It was owned by Rahall Communications, along with WLCY radio (1380 AM, now WWMI; and 94.9 FM, now WWRM). The station was affiliated with ABC, but spent its first month and a half of operation as an independent station, as previous ABC affiliate WSUN-TV (channel 38; frequency now occupied by WTTA) went to court to keep the affiliation. The city of St. Petersburg, owners of WSUN-TV, had been one of the applicants for the Channel 10 license, having jumped in out of fear of losing its ABC affiliation. WLCY ultimately won and formally switched to ABC in a special ceremony on September 1, 1965. As a condition for being placed on VHF channel 10 instead of a UHF placement, the Federal Communications Commission (FCC) required the station to produce 20 hours of public service programming each week.  When WLCY landed the ABC affiliation, it finally gave the Tampa Bay Area market all three commercial television affiliates on the VHF dial alongside WFLA-TV (channel 8) and WTVT (channel 13), respective affiliates of NBC and CBS.

Until 1981, the station was licensed to Largo, north of St. Petersburg, but its studios have always been based in St. Petersburg. The station's first studio facilities were located at 2426 Central Avenue. Its current studios on Gandy Boulevard, originally known as the "Rahall Color Communications Center" were dedicated on October 15, 1968. In-studio broadcasts were fully in color by 1966, but field reports during the station's newscasts remained in black and white until 1972.

The station aired several local children's programs as Submarine 10, Romper Room with June Hurley, 10 Ultimate and This Side Up, and local talk shows such as Russ Byrd's Morning Show, The John Eastman Show, The Liz Richards Show and Murphy in the Morning. From 1966 to 1967, the station produced 10 á Go Go, a teen dance show hosted by WLCY-AM disc jockey Roy Nilson. Another early local program was a morning exercise show, The Fran Carlton Show. The most popular program on channel 10 during that era was the syndicated The Lawrence Welk Show. In the mid-1970s, the station aired Bowling for Dollars with host Jim Bradley.

In October 1971, WXLT (now WWSB, channel 40) signed on to provide ABC network programming to the Sarasota area as WLCY's signal was mediocre to poor in most of Sarasota County. WLCY's transmitter was located at 1754 Solar Drive in Holiday, an unincorporated community in the southwestern corner of Pasco County (where it would remain until 2011). Tampa Bay residents had to use a special VHF antenna that faced away from Riverview in order to view WLCY (this setup was called the "Tampa Bay Special"). Ratings for the station during the early to mid-1970s were dismal, however, compared to WTVT (channel 13) and WFLA-TV (channel 8) and, as a result, channel 10 nearly lost its ABC affiliation. Its transmitter location in Pasco County was the primary contributor to WLCY's low viewership (all of other stations serving the Tampa Bay area operated their transmitters in Riverview, in Hillsborough County). It also operated at a lower power than the other Tampa Bay stations.

In 1977, WLCY-TV was purchased by Dallas, Texas-based Gulf United Broadcasting. New owner Alan Henry (of WINS New York fame), general manager Larry Clamage, and news director George "Bud" Faulder began to turn the station around, changing the call letters to WTSP-TV on September 12, 1978, and hiring several new on-air staff members who changed the face of the station. In June 1979, WTSP began using a logo known as the "sunset 10" (which was later duplicated by its sister station KTSP in Phoenix, Arizona) along with the "Action News" format.

WTSP is also a station of firsts: in October 1979, the station acquired "Sky 10", Tampa Bay's first television news helicopter which was the only one to broadcast live aerial coverage of the aftermath of the infamous Skyway Bridge disaster in May 1980. Another technological advance was Tampa Bay's first satellite news truck called "Star 10" which was introduced in 1984, that beamed signals from distant locations to WTSP's Gandy Boulevard studios. WTSP also acquired Tampa Bay's first Doppler weather radar called "StormSeeker" in 1980, was one of the first television stations in the country to use a computer in weather forecasting called "WeatherEye" in 1979 and was the first station in the market to provide a seven-day forecast in 1992. The station pioneered the use of satellite technology among local television stations in the United States, deploying its own satellite dish in 1979.

In 1979, the station launched an aggressive marketing campaign, and in April of that year, the station built a taller transmission tower, improving the station's broadcast signal. By 1982, WTSP had passed WFLA in the evening news ratings where it remained until the latter part of the decade. WTSP has won many prestigious awards, including the George Foster Peabody award in 1983. Taft Broadcasting (soon to be rebranded Taft Television and Radio) purchased the station along with four other Gulf properties in 1985. Then, in 1988 after a hostile takeover, Taft Television and Radio was forced to sell its independent stations and Fox affiliates to TVX Broadcast Group, while Taft's remaining network affiliate properties, including WTSP, became part of the restructured Great American Broadcasting (which became known as Citicasters by 1995).

CBS affiliation

In June 1994, Scripps Howard Broadcasting arranged for several of its stations (including WFTS-TV, channel 28, which was about to lose its Fox affiliation to then-CBS affiliate WTVT (channel 13) due to a corporate deal between Fox and WTVT's then-owner New World Communications) to affiliate with ABC in order to allow WEWS-TV and WXYZ-TV to renew their affiliations with the network; CBS failed to get both stations to switch to the network, as it was also about to lose its longtime affiliates in Cleveland (WJW-TV) and Detroit (WJBK) to Fox. CBS would move the affiliations to WOIO and WWJ-TV, respectively. WTSP later signed a deal to become the market's new CBS affiliate, resulting in a three-way affiliation swap that occurred on December 12, 1994 with the ABC Sunday Night Movie premiere of Hook being the final ABC program to air on channel 10 on December 11 at 9:00 p.m. Eastern Time. Upon switching to CBS, WTSP went from third to second place in the local news ratings, although a later resurgent WTVT and competition from WFTS' upstart news department would result in the station battling for second with those stations for the remainder of the 1990s. WFLA was the market leader, until dipping to second after the 2009 premiere of the 10 p.m. The Jay Leno Show.

Citicasters (which held on to WTSP and WKRC-TV in Cincinnati, Ohio after it sold its other television stations to New World, whose station properties were later acquired by Fox Television Stations in 1997) merged with Jacor in September 1996. Three months later, in December 1996, the Gannett Company acquired WTSP in a swap deal, selling six of its radio stations to Jacor in return. In the spring of 1999, WTSP debuted a new Doppler weather radar system branded as "Double Doppler". The station ceased using the radar located in Pasco County in 2013; the remaining radar is located at the station's transmitter site in Riverview.

On October 9, 2008, WTSP rebranded from "Tampa Bay's 10" to "10 Connects" (with the "10 Connects Network" being used alternatively). The station's "10 Connects" logo was similar to the one in use since 2002 though without the wave design, along with a small notch in the oval portion of the logo for the "Connects" text (this logo was nicknamed "Pacman" for its resemblance to the video game character.). The station re-branded itself as 10News in July 2010.

The station re-launched its investigative unit, "10Investigates", in 2011 with the nucleus of investigative reporters Mike Deeson and Noah Pransky.  The unit has won several national awards since then, including a national Edward R. Murrow Award for a story on soccer goal safety and national Columbia-duPont and George Polk awards for exposing red light camera injustices.

Around the first week of October 2012, Gannett entered a dispute against Dish Network regarding compensation fees and Dish's AutoHop commercial-skip feature on its Hopper digital video recorders. Gannett ordered that Dish discontinue AutoHop on the account that it is affecting advertising revenues for WTSP. Gannett threatened to pull it from the satellite provider should the skirmish continue beyond October 7 and Dish and Gannett fail to reach an agreement. The two parties eventually reached an agreement after extending the deadline for a few hours.

On June 29, 2015, the Gannett Company split in two, with one side specializing in print media and the other side specializing in broadcast and digital media. WTSP was retained by the latter company, named Tegna. Its branding then evolved to 10News WTSP. In May 2020, the station would be rebranded as 10 Tampa Bay; at that time, the station rolled out a new logo designed by Atlanta-based design firm Matchstic, who had also created an identity for sister station WXIA-TV in 2019.

Programming
WTSP served as the official regional host station for the Tampa Bay Buccaneers' win in Super Bowl LV, which was held in the team's home field, Raymond James Stadium (notably the first team to play and win an NFL title game in its own stadium in the Super Bowl era); WTSP previously served in this same capacity for Super Bowl XXXV in 2001 and Super Bowl XXV in 1991 (as a then-ABC affiliate).

News operation
WTSP presently broadcasts 30 hours of locally produced newscasts each week (with five hours each weekday, two hours on Saturdays and three hours on Sundays). Channel 10's on-air staff during its early years included Dick Crippen, who originally served as weathercaster and then sports anchor (and had also hosted a children's program on the station, Space Station 10); Marshall Cleaver, Al Stockmeyer, Art Johnson, who served as news anchors; and Karol Kelly as a weather anchor. Cleaver was the original news anchor for much of the 1960s and early 1970s, when the station's newscasts were called NewsNight. In 1975, former WFLA-TV anchor Arch Deal became the station's news director and co-anchored Eyewitness News with Marshall Cleaver. Cleaver was removed in 1977, and Deal continued to anchor until channel 10's newscasts were rebranded as Action NewsCenter, a format similar to the newscasts on WTHR in Indianapolis at the time, with former WTVT anchors Rod Challenger and Gary Rebstock along with Rick Moore. WLCY broadcast the first 5:30 p.m. newscast in the Tampa Bay market during the late 1970s up until September 15, 1980, when the newscast was moved to 6 p.m. Beginning in 1979, Don Harrison, Wally Kinnan and Dick Crippen became the new anchors of channel 10's evening newscasts. Ratings surged, making the Tampa Bay market more competitive.

In late 1982, news anchor Don Harrison left WTSP to become an anchor for CNN2 (now HLN). John Wilson and Liz Ayers replaced Harrison as anchor. On January 9, 1983, Sheryl Browne joined Wilson at the anchor desk on Action News, rounding out the station's main anchor team. Longtime WTSP chief meteorologist Dick Fletcher joined the station in March 1980 and became famous for his forecasting during Hurricane Elena in 1985. Award-winning reporter Mike Deeson, legendary sports anchor Ken Broo and feature reporter Bill Campbell, famous for his "Campbell's Corner" segments, bolstered the station in the 1980s. WTSP became the second Tampa Bay area station to launch an hour-long 6 p.m. newscast in 1986 (rival WTVT had been the first to do so many years earlier and WTSP attempted it in an effort to pass WTVT to the top of the local news ratings; however, the effort only lasted until 1987).

However, the station's reputation suffered a serious blow when in the fall of 1988, new assistant news director Michael Shapiro, previously employed at WTVT, began surreptitiously spying on and deleting files from WTVT's newsroom computer system via an unchanged temporary password. Additionally, Shapiro apparently broke into WTVT news director Jim West's office and copied sensitive information from West's computer. By January 1989 the case was being covered by the national news media. Charges were brought against Shapiro and WTSP's news director Terry Cole, but ultimately both sides agreed to settle; Shapiro and Cole were both fired that April.

Cole was replaced by Mel Martin, who set out to restore the station's credibility and improve morale; as part of this effort, on June 4, 1989, the newscasts were rebranded as NewsCenter 10, concurrent with the debut of a 5 p.m. newscast. Longtime anchor John Wilson left the station in September 1993 for WTVT (staying there until his retirement in 2014), and Pat Minarcin replaced him as lead anchor shortly afterwards alongside Sue Zelenko; this team stayed in place through the station's switch to CBS.

In January 1998, Reginald Roundtree replaced Pat Minarcin as the lead male anchor of WTSP's newscasts (by then, known as 10 News); Minarcin later sued the station for age discrimination. On October 14, 2002, the station launched a new news format and image, with a new red color scheme (teased in promos stating "You'll be seeing red") and slogan ("Enjoy it, we do.") used in promos, as well as a new 4 p.m. lifestyle show, Life Around the Bay; a new, state-of-the-art digital newsroom was also constructed for WTSP's news staff. In 2005, the station debuted "Vortex", a powerful new forecasting tool. On January 14, 2008, WTSP became the third station in the Tampa Bay market (behind WFTS-TV and WFLA-TV) to begin broadcasting its local newscasts in high definition; with the conversion came a brand-new news set (designed by Jack Morton Design/PDG), graphics and music package. In September 2008, Chris Suchan replaced morning meteorologist Anna Allen, who had been at the station since 2004. Soon after, Tammie Souza was named chief meteorologist, taking longtime chief meteorologist Dick Fletcher's place after he died from a stroke in February. On October 9, 2008, WTSP began using Gannett's then-new standardized news music (composed by Rampage Music New York) and graphics package (designed by Gannett Graphics Group).

On April 1, 2009, WTSP fired longtime anchor Marty Matthews (who had been anchor of the station's 4 p.m. newscast and a feature reporter for the "Wednesday's Child" child adoption segment prior to her firing) due to budget cuts imposed by Gannett; Matthews had controversially been informed of her termination in a manila envelope sent to her by the station. The previous year, WTSP fired weekend anchor Jennifer Howe, weekend meteorologist Randy Rauch and Anna Allen. The 4 p.m. newscast was later canceled, and Matthews' former co-anchor Dave Wirth became the station's lead sports anchor (Wirth had been a sports anchor for the station for 20 years, until moving to the news desk in 2004).

WTSP's news ratings at 11 p.m. increased during the May 2009 sweeps period, edging out WFLA for first place. In June 2009, the station entered into a Local News Service agreement with Fox-owned WTVT and Scripps-owned WFTS-TV to share news video for use in each of the stations' own reports. As part of this new arrangement, WTSP stopped using its helicopter "Sky 10" on August 1, 2009; it, WTVT and WFTS began sharing a single news helicopter ("Action Air One") to cover news events.

On July 26, 2010, the station's newscasts reverted to the 10 News branding, along with the resurrection of the station's previous logo. The about-face was the result of WTSP switching to a more-traditional news formula, as well as the fact that the "10 Connects" moniker was not understood by many viewers. In August 2010, veteran former WFLA-TV anchor Bill Ratliff joined the station as a political analyst. In February 2011, radio talk show host Bubba the Love Sponge began a nightly editorial segment, "Bring it on Bubba",  on WTSP's 11 p.m. newscast. On September 12, 2011, WTSP debuted a half-hour news program at 9 a.m. as an extension of the station's existing weekday morning newscast, using the anchors and meteorologist of the earlier 5–7 a.m. news block.

In December 2012, WTSP became one of the first Gannett stations to implement a new standard graphics package designed by The Mill. The new graphics use a horizontal design influenced by website and mobile app designs, and utilize color-coded tabs to represent certain categories of topics—matching those used by then-sister publication USA Today.

On April 18, 2017, WTSP underwent a significant re-launch of its news department, renaming its morning and late-night broadcasts 10 News Brightside and 10 News Nightside respectively. The new formats place a larger focus upon stories trending on social media; at the same time, new anchors were introduced for the morning news, including Jackie Fernandez (who previously worked at ABC affiliate WEWS-TV in Cleveland), Rob Finnerty, and meteorologist Grant Gilmore (who came over from sister station WFMY in Greensboro, North Carolina, also a CBS affiliate). Now, Brightside is anchored by Caitlin Lockerbie, who started in the summer of 2019 coming from WATN-TV in Memphis and Frank Wiley who came in from WEWS in early 2021 after Finnerty left to join Newsmax.

Notable former on-air staff
 Bubba the Love Sponge – commentator (2011–2012)
 Michelle Caruso-Cabrera – reporter (1994–1998; later at CNBC)
 Dick Crippen – sports director (1965–1981; later with rival WFLA-TV and Spectrum Sports; since retired)
 Mike Deeson – investigative reporter (1982–2017)
 Rich Fields – meteorologist
 Rob Finnerty – morning anchor (2016–2020; now a morning anchor for Newsmax)
 Dick Fletcher – chief meteorologist (1980–2008; deceased)
 Gina Gaston – anchor/reporter (now at KTRK-TV in Houston)
 Don Harrison – anchor (1979–1982; later with Headline News; deceased)
 Wally Kinnan – chief meteorologist (1978–1980; deceased)
 Dion Lim – evening anchor (2014–2017)
 Miles O'Brien – reporter (1984–1986; now a science correspondent for the PBS NewsHour)
 Noah Pransky – investigative reporter (2009–2019)
 Simeon Rice – co-host of The Blitz, local NFL pregame show for 2021 season
 Craig Sager – weatherman and sports anchor/reporter (1975–1976; later with Turner Sports; deceased)
 Tammie Souza – chief meteorologist (2008–2011; now fill-in for WBBM-TV Chicago and KYW-TV Philadelphia)

Technical information

Subchannels
The station's digital signal is multiplexed:

Translator

Analog-to-digital conversion
WTSP shut down its analog signal, over VHF channel 10, on June 12, 2009, as part of the federally mandated transition from analog to digital television. The station's digital signal relocated from its pre-transition UHF channel 24 to VHF channel 10. The station's previous digital allocation on channel 24 is now occupied by the digital signal of WWSB in Sarasota.

On February 6, 2010, WTSP doubled its transmitter's effective radiated power from 35 kW to 78 kW to help with reception issues that plagued the station's VHF digital signal. At the time, the station's transmitter tower was still segregated farther north in Holiday due to bygone analog spacing requirements.

On January 7, 2011, WTSP filed an application with the FCC to move its transmitter from Holiday to the Riverview antenna farm; however, while WTSP remains short-spaced with WPLG, it will give more signal spacing for its Jacksonville sister station WJXX; both WPLG and WJXX also operate their post-conversion digital signals on channel 10. The FCC granted WTSP a construction permit on January 26. The move was completed on October 1, 2011.

Northern portions of the viewing area lost the station's signal after the move to Riverview; in response to this, the station received a construction permit for a digital fill-in translator on channel 4 that is licensed to St. Petersburg, but will primarily serve northern Citrus County, from a transmitter located near Hernando.

On February 28, 2014, WTSP's second digital subchannel, long the home of an automated "Weather Now" subchannel originated locally on the station's weather computer system, was replaced with Antenna TV. On January 20, 2015, WTSP added an additional digital subchannel, Justice Network (now True Crime Network).

On December 1, 2020, WTSP joined four other Tampa Bay television stations to collaborate on the launch of NEXTGEN TV ATSC 3.0 in the Tampa-St. Petersburg market. The stations joined other early adopters across the country in rolling out the new third-generation digital TV broadcast technology designed to revolutionize how viewers interact with their home screens.

References

External links
 Official website

CBS network affiliates
Twist (TV network) affiliates
Quest (American TV network) affiliates
True Crime Network affiliates
Tegna Inc.
Television channels and stations established in 1965
1965 establishments in Florida
TSP
Mass media in St. Petersburg, Florida
Taft Broadcasting
Former Gannett subsidiaries